John Plant may refer to:

 John Plant (footballer) (1871–1950), England international footballer
 Jack Plant, actor in the 1967 film Ulysses
 John Plant (coach) (1877–1954), American sports coach at Bucknell University, 1926–1947
 John Plant (ethnologist) (born 1954), American ethnologist, biologist and expert on the culture of the Plains Indians
 John Plant, Australian creator of the Primitive Technology channel